The Attorney-General of the Australian Capital Territory, in formal contexts also Attorney-General or Attorney General for the Australian Capital Territory, is the primary Law Officer of the Crown in the Australian Capital Territory. The Attorney General serves as the chief legal and constitutional adviser of the ACT Government and is the head of the Justice and Community Safety Directorate. Its constitutional role was established in 1989 with the enactment by the Federal Parliament of the Australian Capital Territory (Self-Government) Act 1988.

Shane Rattenbury, MLA, a representative of the ACT Greens, became Attorney General on 3 November 2020.

List of attorneys-general

See also
 Australian Capital Territory ministries
 Government of the Australian Capital Territory
 Justice ministry

References

Attorney-General
Attorneys-General of the Australian Capital Territory
Australian Capital Territory